Vohipeno is a district of Vohipeno, which is a part of the region of Fitovinany, which is part of Madagascar. The population of the town was 14,751 in 2018, the population of the district was 292,880.

Geography
Vohipeno is situated at 42 km from Manakara on the national road to Farafangana (RN 12).  It is alongside the Matitanana river, also known as Matitana River.

Communes
The district is further divided into 21 communes:

 Amborobe
 Andemaka
 Ankarimbary
 Anoloka
 Antananabo
 Ifatsy
 Ilakatra
 Ivato
 Lanivo
 Mahabo
 Mahasoabe
 Mahazoarivo
 Nato
 Onjatsy
 Sahalava
 Savana
 Vohilany
 Vohindava
 Vohipeno
 Vohitrindry
 Zafindrafady

References and notes 

Populated places in Fitovinany

Districts of Fitovinany